KXRZ (99.3 FM, "Z99") is a hot adult contemporary/adult top 40 formatted radio station in Alexandria, Minnesota, United States. "Z99" is owned by Leighton Broadcasting which also owns KXRA-FM and KXRA.

The station airs Westwood One's Hot AC format at all times besides the morning show.  Every Sunday, Calvary Lutheran Church airs their 8:30am worship service at 10:30am.

History

Lakes 99.3 (KSTQ)
Z99 originally started out as The Lakes 99.3 (KSTQ) owned by Branstock Communications. In December 1998, the FCC canceled the license of 3 radio stations: KSTQ Alexandria, KMSR Sauk Centre, and KMGK Glenwood. The station was purchased by Paradis Broadcasting in 2000 at which time the call letters were changed to KXRZ.

Z99 (KXRZ)
In February 2000, Paradis Broadcasting began broadcasting Z99 on a Hot Adult Contemporary satellite feed from Jones Radio Networks. until December 2008, due to the purchase from  Triton Media Group.  Jones Hot AC was then relocated into Dial Global's portfolio replacing "Bright AC".   KXRZ - Z99 currently is an affiliate of Westwood One and carries their Hot AC format.

External links

Hot adult contemporary radio stations in the United States
Adult top 40 radio stations in the United States
Radio stations in Alexandria, Minnesota
Radio stations established in 1984